Wang Jian or Jian Wang may refer to:

 Wang Jian (Qin) (fl. 220s BC), Qin general
 Wang Jian (Southern Qi) (452–489), Liu Song and Southern Qi official
 Wang Jian (poet) (767–830), Tang dynasty poet
 Wang Jian (Former Shu) (847–918), founding emperor of Former Shu
 Wang Jian (17th-century painter) (1598–1677), painter during the Ming and Qing dynasties
 Wang Jian (geneticist) (born 1954), Chinese geneticist and biotechnology entrepreneur
 Jian Wang (contemporary painter) (born 1958), U.S.-based Chinese painter
 Wang Jian (businessman) (1961–2018), co-founder of Hainan Airlines and HNA Group
 Wang Jian (computer scientist) (born 1962), Chinese computer scientist
 Jian Wang (cellist) (born 1968), U.K.-based Chinese cellist
 Wang Jian (powerlifter), Chinese powerlifter
 Wang Jian (table tennis), Chinese table tennis player
  Wang Jian (biologist), Chinese biologist

See also
 Taejo of Goryeo (877–943), personal name Wang Geon, pronounced Wang Jian in Chinese
 Wang Jianan (disambiguation)